Coptology is the science of Coptic studies, the study of the Coptic language and Coptic literature.

Origin
The European interest in Coptology may have started as early as the 15th century AD. The term was used in 1976 when the First International Congress of Coptology was held in Cairo under the title "Colloquium on the Future of Coptic Studies" (11-17 December). This was followed by the establishment of the "International Association for Coptic Studies". One of the founders of the Colloquium and the Association was Pahor Labib, director of the Coptic Museum in Cairo during 1951-65. The words 'Coptology' and 'Coptologist' were introduced into the English language by Aziz Suryal Atiya.

Worldwide institutions
There are now institutions that give more or less regular courses of Coptology in 47 countries around the world, including Australia, Great Britain, Canada, Germany, Israel, Spain, Switzerland, and the United States. A rotating chair of Coptic studies was opened at the American University in Cairo in 2002.

Divisions
Art and textiles
Language
History
Architecture
Literature
Music

Journals
Coptologia Publications - Journal of Coptic Thought and Spirituality
Journal of Coptic Studies
Göttinger Miszellen

Prominent Coptologists
Aziz Suryal Atiya
O. H. E. Burmester
Christian Cannuyer
Walter Ewing Crum
Iris Habib Elmasry
Stephen Emmel
Nabila Erian
Gawdat Gabra
Rodolphe Kasser
Pahor Labib
Otto Friedrich August Meinardus
Jozef Vergote
Hilde Zaloscer

See also
Coptic history
Coptic Museum
Coptic Egypt: The Christians of the Nile
Institute of Coptic Studies
Egyptology

References

External links
International Association for Coptic Studies
موقع الدراسات القبطية والأرثوذكسية

 
Coptic culture
Coptic history
Coptic language
Cultural studies